Marchand is a town in ZF Mgcawu District Municipality in the Northern Cape province of South Africa.

The town is located on the R359 road, on the way to the Augrabie Falls.

References

Populated places in the Kai !Garib Local Municipality